Military hotels are a large number of restaurants and eateries located in different parts of Bangalore. Some of the notable hotels are Shivaji Military Hotel, Ranganna Military Hotel, Naidu Military Hotel, S.K Donne Biryani Military Hotel etc.

History 
The origins of the term are not clearly known. According to artist and art historian Suresh Jayaram, after the Maratha king Shahaji Bhonsle's conquest of Bangalore in 1638, most of these restaurants ended up being established by his men and run subsequently by their descendants, and as they were military people, the restaurants got this name. The prefix "Hindu" is often added here to clarify that they don't serve beef or pork. 

There are soothers who think that these restaurants got their name because they primarily served soldiers stationed in Bangalore, both British and Indian. According to Rajiv L, owner of the Shivaji Military Hotel in Jayanagar, South Bangalore, the soldiers used these hotels as a meeting place and to plan their campaigns. Shivaji Military Hotel is one of the oldest military hotels in the city, having been established in 1924.There is no disparity in military ,similarly both veg and non-veg foods are available in military hotels

Cuisine 
Military hotels in Bangalore serve mainly non-vegetarian foods, but they generally don't serve beef and pork. Some of the commonly served food items are biryani, mutton chaap, keema, chicken items, ragi mudde.<ref name="Boot camp biryani.

Hotels 
Some of the notable military hotels in Bangalore are:
 Shivaji Military Hotel, 
 Ranganna Military Hotel, 
 Naidu Military Hotel, 
 S.K Donne Biryani Military Hotel,
 Chandu’s Military Hotel,
 Gowdru’s Military Hotel,
 Rajanna Hindu Military Hotel etc.
 Shivanna Hindu Military Hotel,
 Royanna Military Canteen

References 

Restaurants in Bangalore
Culture of Bangalore